Your Class or Mine (Traditional Chinese: 尖子攻略) is a TVB modern drama series broadcast in August 2008.

Synopsis 
Pang Kam-Chau (Bobby Au-Yeung) is left broke when his ex-girlfriend takes everything away from him. He hides in a football stadium to run away from the loan sharks.  He then overhears Jason Ching Kwok-Chu (Derek Kwok) discussing with a business partner on sponsoring the Keegan Spirit soccer team. Hearing this perfect opportunity to possibly regain his wealth, Chau befriends the team coach, Fan Dai-Wai (Benz Hui), and is given the title of Operation Director of the football team.

With the win in the second quarter, Chau approaches Jason and his business partner to sponsor the team, by promising to make the "three treasures" of the team, Lam Yik-Dan (Kelvin Leung), Chan Lik-Ban (Oscar Leung), and Fan Pui-Tung (Him Law) into academically fit players and bring the team to the A league. They agree to sponsor and with Jason's hidden relationship with Kelly Yim Ka-Lai (Sheren Tang), nicknamed "A+ tutor" of a HK cram school. Three soccer players were tutored for the upcoming national examination. Kelly later discovers the players were cheating on the exams, and she refuses to continue tutoring. Kelly was angry, but cannot back out. She later claim that the three players must achieve a grade of 20 points or Chau will have to resign from his post.

Chau and Kelly continued to have their differences, but always put the benefits of the three treasures in mind. One day an intimate photograph of Kelly and Jason was published in a magazine. Jason's father is outraged and demotes Jason, giving the responsibility of the soccer team to his younger brother, Benny Ching Kwok-Ho (Vincent Wong). Later their relationships are strained in a 3 way relationship.  And the finale is settled in a soccer game.

Cast

Viewership ratings

Awards and nominations
41st TVB Anniversary Awards (2008)
 "Best Drama"
 "Best Actor in a Leading Role" Top 10 (Bobby Au-Yeung - Pang Kam-Chau)
 "Best Actress in a Leading Role" Top 10 (Sheren Tang - Kelly Yim Ka-Lai)
 "Best Actor in a Supporting Role" Top 5 (Him Law - Fan Pui-Tung)

References

External links
TVB.com Your Class or Mine - Official Website 
Astro On Demand.com Your Class or Mine - Astro Official Website 

TVB dramas
2008 Hong Kong television series debuts
2008 Hong Kong television series endings